The 2022–23 season is the 91st season in the history of FC Vaduz and their second consecutive season in the Swiss Challenge League. The season covers the period from 1 July 2022 to 30 June 2023.

Vaduz became the first club from Liechtenstein to play in a UEFA tournament group stage.

Players

Out on loan

Pre-season and friendlies

Competitions

Overall record

Swiss Challenge League

League table

Results summary

Results by round

Matches

Liechtenstein Cup

UEFA Europa Conference League

Second qualifying round 
The draw for the second qualifying round was held on 15 June 2022.

Third qualifying round 
The draw for the third qualifying round was held on 18 July 2022.

Play-off round 
The draw for the play-off round was held on 2 August 2022.

Group stage 

The draw for the group stage was held on 26 August 2022.

Notes

References 

FC Vaduz seasons
2022–23 UEFA Europa Conference League participants seasons